Stasik may refer to:

Mirosław Stasik, a toxicologist
Ryan Stasik, an American musician for rock band Umphrey's McGee
Asteroid 4131 Stasik
A diminutive for Stanisław

Polish-language surnames